Xavier Cedeño Quiñones (born August 26, 1986) is a Puerto Rican professional baseball relief pitcher who is a free agent. He has played in Major League Baseball (MLB) for the Houston Astros, Washington Nationals, Tampa Bay Rays, Chicago White Sox, Milwaukee Brewers and Chicago Cubs.

Career

Colorado Rockies
Cedeño attended Asuncíon Rodriguez De Sala School in Guayanilla, Puerto Rico, and Miami-Dade College. The Colorado Rockies selected Cedeño in the 31st round of the 2004 Major League Baseball draft. He played in the Rockies' minor league system from 2005 to 2009. He played for the Casper Rockies, Asheville Tourists, Modesto Nuts and Tulsa Drillers. He was released at the end of spring training in 2010 and he did not play that year.

Houston Astros
Cedeño was signed to a minor league contract by the Houston Astros on December 22, 2010. With the AA Corpus Christi Hooks of the Texas League, he was 5–6 with a 3.95 ERA in 23 games with 19 starts. On June 22 against the Frisco RoughRiders he struck out the first nine batters he faced in a record-setting 14 strikeout game. He was subsequently promoted to the AAA Oklahoma City RedHawks.

The Astros promoted Cedeño to the major leagues on September 11, 2011, and he made his Major League debut on September 16 against the Chicago Cubs. He faced two batters, the first one flew out to right field and the second one singled. He appeared in two more games that season, allowing five runs in one inning  in his last appearance. He was outrighted off the 40 man roster on October 5.

Cedeño signed a new minor league contract with the Astros on October 24. Cedeño began the 2012 season with the RedHawks, where he had a 2–0 win–loss record with a 0.42 earned run average in 17 games before being promoted to Houston when Fernando Abad was placed on the 15-day disabled list. In 44 games with the Astros, he had a 3.77 ERA.

Cedeño played for the Puerto Rican national baseball team in the 2013 World Baseball Classic. He had one save and a 2.08 ERA in seven appearances. In five games for the Astros at the start of the 2013 season he allowed 11 runs in only 6.1 innings.

Washington Nationals
He was claimed on waivers by the Washington Nationals on April 23, 2013, and assigned to the Syracuse Chiefs of the Class AAA International League.  In 25 games for the Nationals over parts of three seasons, he had a 3.38 ERA.

The Nationals designated him for assignment on April 14, 2015.

Tampa Bay Rays
Cedeño was traded to the Los Angeles Dodgers on April 22, 2015, in exchange for cash considerations. The Dodgers designated him for assignment on April 24 and then traded him to the Tampa Bay Rays for cash considerations on April 27.

Chicago White Sox

Cedeño signed a contract with the Chicago White Sox on January 26, 2018. He was activated from the disabled list on June 7, 2018.

Milwaukee Brewers
On August 31, 2018, Cedeño was traded to the Milwaukee Brewers in exchange for minor-league prospects Bryan Connell and Johan Dominguez.

Chicago Cubs
On February 14, 2019, Cedeño signed a one-year deal with the Chicago Cubs. The deal is worth $900,000 plus incentives. After a stint on the injured list for left wrist inflammation and a rehab assignment with the Triple-A Iowa and Double-A Tennessee, the Cubs activated Cedeño on May 11. He was placed on the disabled list on May 22, 2019. He became a free agent after the 2019 season.

See also
 List of Major League Baseball players from Puerto Rico

References

External links

1986 births
Living people
People from Guayanilla, Puerto Rico
Major League Baseball players from Puerto Rico
Major League Baseball pitchers
2013 World Baseball Classic players
Houston Astros players
Washington Nationals players
Tampa Bay Rays players
Chicago White Sox players
Milwaukee Brewers players
Chicago Cubs players
Casper Rockies players
Asheville Tourists players
Modesto Nuts players
Tulsa Drillers players
Corpus Christi Hooks players
Oklahoma City RedHawks players
Syracuse Chiefs players
Cangrejeros de Santurce (baseball) players
Gigantes de Carolina players
Charlotte Knights players
Liga de Béisbol Profesional Roberto Clemente pitchers